Ibrahim "Ibro" Rahimić (born 17 April 1963) is a Bosnian professional football manager and former player. He played as a defender.

Playing career
Rahimić played for hometown club Velež Mostar on two occasions and also for Leotar. Thought to be very talented, he never showed the biggest talent he had throughout his short playing career.

Rahimić was part of the Velež team that played the 1988–89 Yugoslav Cup final match against Partizan. He had to retire from football in 1991 at the early age of 28, because of a serious knee injury sustained in a Yugoslav league match while playing for Velež.

Rahimić played over 80 league matches for Velež and over 100 matches in all competitions and almost 50 league matches for Leotar.

Managerial career

Velež Mostar
In 2012, Rahimić was named the new manager of Velež. In his first season with the club, Velež finished 13th in the league, avoiding relegation. In September 2013, after a poor start to the 2013–14 season, Rahimić was sacked.

Mladost Doboj Kakanj
On 14 June 2015, Rahimić became the new manager of Bosnian Premier League newcomer Mladost Doboj Kakanj. In his first season with Mladost, the club finished in 10th place in the league and avoided relegation. After a good start to the next season, in September 2016, Rahimić made the decision to leave Mladost and to come back to Velež.

Return to Velež Mostar
On 26 September 2016, Rahimić was once again named the new manager of Velež. After two seasons, Velež under the command of Rahimić gained promotion to the Bosnian Premier League after finishing in 1st place in the 2018–19 season.

On 5 August 2019, after a series of poor results, Rahimić resigned as Velež manager.

Return to Mladost Doboj Kakanj
On 10 September 2019, one month after leaving Velež, Rahimić came back after almost three years to Mladost Doboj Kakanj and became their new manager. His first competitive game back in charge of Mladost ended in a 1–0 away loss against Čelik Zenica. His first win at Mladost was in a cup game against Jedinstvo Bihać.

On 27 November 2019, Rahimić's contract with Mladost was terminated due to bad results.

Honours

Manager
Velež Mostar
First League of FBiH: 2018–19

References

External links

1963 births
Living people
Sportspeople from Mostar
Association football defenders
Yugoslav footballers
FK Velež Mostar players
FK Leotar players
Yugoslav First League players
Bosnia and Herzegovina football managers
FK Velež Mostar managers
FK Mladost Doboj Kakanj managers
Premier League of Bosnia and Herzegovina managers